Yo Soy La Tradición is an album by Miguel Zenón, released in 2018. The album was recorded with Spektral Quartet and features jazz interpretations of folklore and traditional music from Zenón's native Puerto Rico. The second track "Cadenas" was nominated for a Grammy Award for Best Improvised Jazz Solo in 2019.

Track listing 
All songs written by Miguel Zenón.

References

2018 albums
Miguel Zenón albums